Performance and Cocktails is the second studio album by Welsh rock band Stereophonics. It was released by V2 on 8 March 1999. The name of the album comes from lyrics in the album's first song, "Roll Up and Shine", just like the previous album's name, Word Gets Around came from lyrics in that album's final song.

The album was a surprise commercial success for Stereophonics but it received mixed reviews.

Recording
The songs were variously recorded at Real World Studios in Bath, Parkgate in Sussex and Rockfield in Monmouth.

Album cover
The cover photograph was taken by Scarlet Page in autumn 1998 at a football pitch under the Westway in London, and was inspired by an earlier Annie Leibovitz photograph of a couple kissing outside a prison. The British journalist Tony Barrell did extensive research in 2007 to find the female model in the foreground. In the Sunday Times on 11 November 2007, he revealed the previously unknown identity of the model as 27-year-old mother-of-two Lucy Joplin. In an interview with Barrell, Joplin explained that the "faraway look" in her eyes was the result of an evening consuming absinthe and opium, and that she was paid just £75 in cash for the shoot. The name of the then 23-year-old male model is Kipp Burns on loan from Mannique models, King's Road.

Track listing

Reception

Critical response

Performance and Cocktails received generally mixed reviews. At AllMusic, Jason Damas criticised the album for not being as consistent as Word Gets Around; he did however praise "T Shirt Sun Tan", "She Takes Her Clothes Off" and "Pick a Part That's New", calling them the highlights of the album.

Brent DiCrescenzo from Pitchfork had a generally negative review of the album, comparing Stereophonics to Oasis and by summarising the album as, "Basically, what Performance and Cocktails boils down to is loud music engineered and crafted for Britain's summer festival circuit that practically guarantees a perennially muddy experience." Similarly, Barry Walters of Rolling Stone also compared the band to Oasis, stating, "[they] sound like Oasis trying to be Radiohead."

Commercial performance
Performance and Cocktails gave Stereophonics three straight top five singles in the British charts with "The Bartender and the Thief" reaching number-three, and both "Just Looking" and "Pick a Part That's New" reaching number-four. The album itself was a success, topping the UK Albums Chart selling 119,954 copies in its first week and going on to become the fifth best selling album in the UK in 1999. Such was the album's persistence, that it re-entered the UK charts over four years after its initial release, reaching number twenty-five in January 2004.

Legacy
With sales of over 2.5 million, Performance and Cocktails is the Stereophonics' second best-selling album (after Just Enough Education to Perform, which has sold over 3.5 million). The record has been certified 5× Platinum in the UK and Platinum in Europe. It has spent a total of 101 weeks in the UK top 100 charts.

The album is seen as one of the best albums in 90s British rock history. At the Kerrang! awards in 1999, Performance and Cocktails won the "Best Album" award and Stereophonics further won "Best British Band" the same year. On their "Albums of the Year" list, the record was placed at number 5. Listeners at Absolute Radio voted for their album of the decade and Performance and Cocktails ranked at number 27. On the radio's shortlist it was included as one of the albums that helped define the sound of the 90s along with Word Gets Around At the Mercury Music Prize awards, the album was nominated for the 1999 prize but was only listed as a "Shortlisted nominee." "Pick a Part That's New" was used in a BT advert for their unlimited broadband deal.

Re-release
On 24 August 2010, Stereophonics announced on their website that Performance and Cocktails, along with Word Gets Around, were to be re-released. To accompany the re-releases, Stereophonics performed all the songs on both the albums at the Hammersmith Apollo on 17 and 18 October 2010. They were released on 18 October 2010 and were made into two forms:

Deluxe: The original album on one disc and a bonus CD featuring 12 b-sides and rare tracks.

Super-deluxe: The album on one disc (as listed above) and two bonus CDs (one with 15 b-sides and the other includes 10 rare tracks), artcards and a replica of Kelly Jones' notebook.

Personnel

Stereophonics
 Kelly Jones – vocals, guitar
 Richard Jones – bass guitar
 Stuart Cable – drums

Additional
 Marshall Bird – hammond, Rhodes piano, piano, mellotron
 Astrid – backing vocals on "I Stopped to Fill My Car Up"

Technical
 Bird & Bush – producer, engineer, mixing on "She Takes Her Clothes Off"
 Al Clay – mixing
 Ian Cooper – mastering

Charts and certifications

Weekly charts

Singles

Year-end charts

Certifications

|+Certifications

References
Notes

Footnotes

External links
Performance and Cocktails at stereophonics.com

Stereophonics albums
1999 albums
V2 Records albums